

Events
Possible founding of Cyzicus
Alleged founding of Trabzon

Births

Deaths

References

750s BC